Gardi is a small unincorporated community and census-designated place on the outskirts of Jesup, Georgia, in the United States. The community exists primarily along U.S. Route 341. 

It first appeared as a CDP in the 2020 Census with a population of 91.

Some say the community derives its name from the fact one had to guard one's eyes when passing through a nearby swamp, while others believe the name Gardi is derived by shortening and altering the surname Gardner.

Demographics

2020 census

Note: the US Census treats Hispanic/Latino as an ethnic category. This table excludes Latinos from the racial categories and assigns them to a separate category. Hispanics/Latinos can be of any race.

References

Unincorporated communities in Wayne County, Georgia
Census-designated places in Wayne County, Georgia